Parashorea aptera is a species of plant in the family Dipterocarpaceae. It is a tree endemic to Sumatra. It is a critically endangered species.

References

aptera
Endemic flora of Sumatra
Trees of Sumatra
Critically endangered plants
Taxonomy articles created by Polbot